Wolfgang Kapp (24 July 1858 – 12 June 1922) was a German civil servant and journalist. A strict nationalist, he is best known for being the leader of the Kapp Putsch.

Early life
Kapp was born in New York City where his father Friedrich Kapp, a political activist and later Reichstag delegate for the National Liberal Party, had settled after the failed European revolutions of 1848. In 1870 the family returned to Germany and Kapp's schooling continued in Berlin at the Friedrich Wilhelm Gymnasium (High School). Wolfgang Kapp married Margarete Rosenow in 1884; the couple had three children. Through his wife's family, Kapp acquired a family connection with politically conservative elements. In 1886, he graduated at the conclusion of his law studies at the University of Tübingen and was appointed to a position in the Finance Ministry the same year.

Political activist
After an ordinary official career, Kapp became the founder of the Agricultural Credit Institute in East Prussia which achieved great success in promoting the prosperity of landowners and farmers in that province. He was consequently in close touch with the Junkers of East Prussia, and during the First World War made himself their mouthpiece in an attack on Chancellor Bethmann Hollweg. Kapp's pamphlet, entitled Die Nationalen Kreise und der Reichskanzler and published in the early summer of 1916, criticized German foreign and domestic policy under Hollweg. This pamphlet appeared about the same time as the attacks of "Junius Alter" and evoked an indignant reply from Hollweg in the Reichstag, in which he spoke of "loathsome abuse and slanders."

In 1917, along with Alfred von Tirpitz, Kapp founded the Deutsche Vaterlandspartei (Fatherland Party), of which he briefly became chairman. He was one of a number of prominent figures of the right, including General Ludendorff and Waldemar Pabst, who set up in August 1919 the Nationale Vereinigung (National Union), a right-wing think-tank which campaigned for a counter-revolution to install a form of conservative militaristic government. The Nationale Vereinigung did not, however, press for the restoration of the monarchy, the Kaiser having bowed to Army pressure and left for his exile in the Netherlands in November 1918. In 1919, which saw the consolidation in Germany of the Weimar Republic, Kapp was a member of the Deutschnationale Volkspartei (German National People's Party).

Germany's defeat in the First World War was seen by nationalists such as Kapp as a humiliation and a betrayal. He became an exponent of the Stab-in-the-back myth and a vehement critic of the Treaty of Versailles. In 1919 he was elected to the Reichstag as a monarchist.

Putsch

"We will not govern according to any theory", Wolfgang Kapp, 13 March 1920

In March 1920 Hermann Ehrhardt, the leader of the Freikorps known as the Ehrhardt Brigade, was authorized by General Walther von Lüttwitz (Commander of Reichswehr Command Group I) to proceed and use the Marine Brigade to take Berlin from the Weimar Government. The Weimar government fled to Dresden and then on to Stuttgart in order to avoid arrest by rebel Reichswehr troops.

Though proclaiming a new government and state administration, Kapp along with Lüttwitz failed to calculate the lack of support for such a coup. The majority of the old establishment, civil service, labour unions and general population did not side with the putschists and as a result the newly proclaimed state lasted for a mere two days before a General Strike was called by the SPD. The Reichswehr, under the command of Hans von Seeckt, failed to uphold their constitutional commitment as von Seeckt refused to defend the Republican government against the rebellious Freikorps units. The Weimar regime was saved by the public by means of the strike, but there were also other factors behind the failure of the coup. These include the lack of outward and active support from the military elite, judiciary and civil service who were reluctant to commit to the Putsch from its beginning.

When the coup d'état failed Kapp fled to Sweden. After two years in exile, he returned to Germany in April 1922 to justify himself in a trial at the Reichsgericht. He died in custody in Leipzig shortly afterwards of cancer.

References

External links
 

1858 births
1922 deaths
Politicians from New York City
American people of German descent
German Protestants
German Fatherland Party politicians
German National People's Party politicians
Members of the 13th Reichstag of the German Empire
Prussian politicians
University of Göttingen alumni
University of Tübingen alumni
Kapp Putsch participants
German exiles
German expatriates in Sweden
German people who died in prison custody
Prisoners who died in German detention
Deaths from cancer in Germany
German monarchists
Political party founders